The Wright Flying School, also known as the Wright School of Aviation, was operated by the Wright Company from 1910 to 1916 and trained 119 individuals to fly Wright airplanes.

History
Orville Wright began training students on March 19, 1910 in Montgomery, Alabama at a site that later became Maxwell Air Force Base. With the onset of milder weather that May, the school relocated to Huffman Prairie Flying Field near Dayton, Ohio, where the Wrights developed practical aviation in 1904 and 1905 and where the Wright Company tested its airplanes. They also had a facility in Augusta, Georgia run by Frank Coffyn. Some of the earliest graduates became members of the Wright Exhibition Team.

Sites

Maxwell Air Force Base in Montgomery, Alabama
Huffman Prairie Flying Field near Dayton, Ohio
Augusta, Georgia

Notable students
1st Lt. Henry H. Arnold (1886–1950) 
1st Lt. Thomas DeWitt Milling (1887–1960)
 Calbraith Perry Rodgers (1879–1912) started on June 5, 1911. Within a week, his instructor was letting him takeoff, fly, and land the airplane, but when he asked to be allowed a solo flight, the instructor said "no". Rodgers then bought the training airplane, a Wright Flyer Model B, the first to be privately owned.
 Oscar Brindley (1885–1918)
 Walter Richard Brookins (1889–1953)
 Howard W. Gill (1882–1912)
 Oliver LeBoutillier (1894-1983)
 Philip Orin Parmelee (1887–1912)
 Leda Richberg-Hornsby (1886–1939)
 Marjorie Stinson (1895–1975)  
 Edward Stinson (1893–1932)
J. Clifford Turpin (1886–1966)
Arthur L. "Al" Welsh (1881–1912) learned to fly and then in the summer of 1910 became an instructor at the Wright Company's flying school.
George William Beatty (1887–1955) was taught by Al Welsh, taking his first lesson on June 24, 1911 and soloing on July 23, 1911.

References

External links
 Pioneer Flyers Who Trained At Wright Brothers Field  

Aviation history of the United States
Wright brothers
History of Montgomery, Alabama
Educational institutions established in 1910
1910 establishments in Alabama